is a Japanese voice actress and singer from Kanagawa Prefecture. She is affiliated with VIMS.

Filmography

Anime
2013
Aoki Hagane no Arpeggio - Student D 
Karneval - Yori's Mother 
Genshiken: Second Generation - Sawawatari

2014
Brynhildr in the Darkness - Risa Kashiwagi
Is the Order a Rabbit - Girl B
Ai Tenchi Muyo! - Hachiko, Inukai
Bladedance of Elementalers - Rinslet Laurenfrost
Wolf Girl and Black Prince - Female College Student, female Student, Tsubomi's mother

2015
Shigatsu wa Kimi no Uso - Female Student
Tsubu Doll - Tana Mizuki

2016
Tokyo Ghoul: Pinto - Clerk
Aikatsu Stars - Miki Katsura
Shōnen Maid - Rika Sakura
Keijo!!! - Mai Itoeda
Girlish Number - Female voice actress, Woman, Woman in Couple

2017
Recovery of an MMO Junkie - Nao
Kings Game The Animation - Rina Minami
Black Clover - Noelle Silva, Acier Silva

2018
Uma Musume Pretty Derby - Super Creek
Harukana Receive - Haruka Ōzora

2019
Bananya and the Curious Bunch - Narrator
Squishy! Black Clover - Noelle Silva
Azur Lane - Yorktown, Yukikaze

2022
Extreme Hearts - Sumika Maehara
Peter Grill and the Philosopher's Time: Super Extra - Fruitalia Eldriel

2023
Onimai: I'm Now Your Sister! - Asahi Ōka

Original net animation
2022
Kakegurui Twin - Moderator

Anime films
2023
Black Clover: Sword of the Wizard King - Noelle Silva

Video games
2012
Koebura - Igarashi Kyoka

2013
Idolism - Kagura Yuzuki
Tokyo 7th Sisters - Asami Miwako

2016
Girls' Frontline - T-CMS, Kord
Tagatame no Alchemist (The Alchemist Code) - Mei Fang
Shadowverse - Arisa

2017
Fire Emblem Heroes - Nino, Katarina (Japanese version)

2018
 Gal*Gun 2
Azur Lane - Yorktown, Yukikaze, Concord, Yorktown II
Black Clover: Quartet Knights - Noelle Silva. 
Black Clover: Phantom Knights - Noelle Silva.
Kirara Fantasia  - Oozora Haruka.
Princess Connect! Re:Dive - Arisa

2019
Arknights - Gitano, Myrrh

2020
Granblue Fantasy - Alspia

2021
DC Super Hero Girls: Teen Power - Poison Ivy
Revived Witch - Cynethia

References

External links
 
 
Official agency profile 

Living people
Japanese women pop singers
Japanese video game actresses
Japanese voice actresses
Musicians from Kanagawa Prefecture
Voice actresses from Kanagawa Prefecture
1987 births
21st-century Japanese actresses
21st-century Japanese women singers
21st-century Japanese singers